Scolpaig is a district on the north-west coast of the island of North Uist in the Outer Hebrides of Scotland. In 2018 it was unsuccessfully proposed as the site of a spaceport backed by the Scottish government.  In 2019 it was again proposed as the site of a spaceport.

Scolpaig Tower is a folly that was erected at Loch Scolpaig as part of famine relief works in about 1830.

Coastline

Lewisian Gneiss rock formations at Scolpaig are unique on the Atlantic coast of Uist, which is predominantly machair and sandy beaches.  Striking rock formations, sheer cliff faces and breeding cormorant and black guillemot colonies are to be seen along the coast at Scolpaig.

Spaceport

In 2019 Comhairle nan Eilean Siar (the local council) agreed to invest £1m to purchase land at Scolpaig for the construction of a launch facility, in a consortium with Highlands and Islands Enterprise, the UK technology company QinetiQ and the consultancy Commercial Space Technologies (CST). Rockets would be launched vertically to carry payloads of up to 500kg into sun synchronous and polar orbits. The project was initially promised to create 50 to 70 jobs.

Friends of Scolpaig, formed in August 2019, to oppose the development of a spaceport in the National Scenic Area of Scolpaig. Concerns included the council not consulting with the community prior to spending one million pounds on the project, intention to approve the planning application prior to community engagement and avoiding the requirement to carry out an Environmental Impact Assessment.

The Royal Society for Protection of Birds (RSPB) objected to the proposal on the grounds that the area proposed for the spaceport is extremely important for wildlife and hosts several protected species that are sensitive to human disturbance and are listed in Annex I of the Birds Directive. These species are given special legal protection. The applicant, Comhairle nan Eilean Siar (the local council) did not provide an Environmental Impact Assessment. The RSPB stated in their objection that an Environmental Impact Assessment was required.

References

Villages on North Uist
Spaceports in Europe